Synodontis levequei is a species of upside-down catfish endemic to Guinea, where it occurs in the Konkouré River basin. This species grows to a length of  SL.

References

Further reading

External links 

levequei
Freshwater fish of West Africa
Endemic fauna of Guinea
Fish described in 1987